Havaptuk Monastery, also known as Havotsptuk, is a medieval Armenian monastery, which is situated near the village of Vank, in the disputed region of Nagorno-Karabakh, de facto in the Republic of Artsakh, de jure in Azerbaijan.

The monastery complex consists of a small church, a narthex and a small church. In addition to these buildings, there are also the remains of other structures. There are two cemeteries near the monastery.

Inscriptions 
According to the inscriptions, the church was built in 1163 and rebuilt in 1223. At the entrance to the main church of the monastery, the following inscription in Armenian has been preserved:

According to another inscription, the church was restored in 1223 under the principality of Hasan-Jalal Dawla.

In June 2016, during the scientific expedition in the Republic of Artsakh, new epigraphic inscriptions were discovered on many monuments, including in the Havaptuk monastery.

Literature

References 

Armenian Apostolic monasteries
Buildings and structures in the Republic of Artsakh
Buildings and structures completed in 1233